Michael Zakian (April 7, 1957-January 14, 2020) was an American art historian and museum curator. He was the director of the Frederick R. Weisman Museum in Malibu, California for 25 years until his death in 2020. His academic research focused on abstract expressionism.

Early life and education

Michael Zakian was born in New York City in 1957. As a child, he visited museums, including the Guggenheim Museum, Metropolitan Museum of Art, and the Museum of Modern Art. These visits instilled Zakian's interest in the visual arts. He attended Columbia University and earned his bachelor's degree in art history. Next, he earned his master's degree and doctorate, while serving as a teaching assistant, in art history from Rutgers University. His focus was abstract expressionism.

Career

In 1995, Zakian became the director of the Frederick R. Weisman Museum at Pepperdine University. He also was an adjunct professor at Pepperdine University's Seaver College.

Later life and legacy

Zakian died in January 2020. 

Zakian's papers are held in the collection of Pepperdine University.

References

External links
"Pepperdine Mourns the Loss of Weisman Museum Director Michael Zakian" from Pepperdine University
"Michael Zakian on Richard Diebenkorn: Beginnings, 1942–1955" from the Richard Diebenkorn Foundation

1957 births
2020 deaths
Deaths from pancreatic cancer
American art historians
Historians from California
Historians from New York (state)
21st-century American historians
20th-century American historians
Columbia University School of the Arts alumni
Rutgers University alumni
Directors of museums in the United States
Pepperdine University faculty
People from New York City